The Uttar Pradesh legislative assembly election followed as a result the expiration of the five-year term of the previous legislature elected in Uttar Pradesh, India. The election to the Uttar Pradesh Legislative Assembly was held in seven phases from 8 February through 3 March 2012.  Uttar Pradesh has the world's largest population for a sub-national democracy. The incumbent chief minister Mayawati's Bahujan Samaj Party, which previously won an absolute majority of seats, was defeated by Mulayam Singh Yadav's Samajwadi Party, which gained an absolute majority in the election. Mulayam's son and Samajwadi party president Akhilesh Yadav was nominated as chief minister by the party.

Background
Uttar Pradesh is the largest state in India in terms of population, but the fourth largest in terms of landmass after the bifurcation to create Uttarakhand. It is also considered politically important because of the number of seats it returns to the Lok Sabha and as including the constituencies of such nationally notable figures as Sonia Gandhi, Rahul Gandhi, Varun Gandhi and Maneka Gandhi of the Nehru-Gandhi family dynasty. It was also previously the home of Prime Ministers Indira Gandhi and Atal Bihari Vajpayee.

The legislative assembly has 403 seats, 206 of which were won by the BSP in the previous election.

Schedule
Initially the ECI announced on 24 December 2011 that the election will occur in seven phases on 4, 8, 11, 15, 19, 23 and 28 February and the results will be declared on 3 March. Later, the date for announcement of result was changed to 6 March.

On 9 January, the Election Commission had announced that the original date of 4 February for the first phase had been changed to 3 March, while vote counting had moved from 4 to 6 March due to celebrations for Barawafat, for which an Election Commission official said that: "There were concerns people would not be able to come out to exercise their franchise."

Parties
A total of 223 parties vied for the 403 seats in the legislative assembly. This was an increase compared to the previous election which featured 131 parties who had filed candidates. The parties represented in the previous legislature were:
 Bahujan Samaj Party (BSP) (incumbent) (contested 403 seats)
 Samajwadi Party (SP) (Resulting majority elected to power)
 Bharatiya Janata Party (BJP)
 Indian National Congress (INC) (pre-election alliance with RLD)
 Rashtriya Lok Dal (RLD) (pre-election alliance with INC)
 Rashtriya Parivartan Dal
 Akhil Bhartiya Loktantrik Congress
 United Democratic Party
 Bharatiya Jan Shakti
 Jan Morcha
 Rashtriya Swabhimaan Party
 Peace Party of India
 Apna Dal
 Quami Ekta Dal
 JD(U)
 All India Trinamool Congress
 Communist Party of India
 Communist Party of India (Marxist)

2010 issues
In 2010, INC general secretary Rahul Gandhi was arrested, along with, while he was staging a sit-in in Bhatta Parsaul village in support of farmers agitating against inadequate compensation for the acquisition of their land for a highway project. Though he was released after three hours, INC party members in other parts of the country such as Mumbai's western suburbs of Santacruz, Malad and Borivali protested against his arrest. Amidst the event he said: "I have seen the violence unleashed on your youth and women. By seeing what has happened here, I feel ashamed to be an Indian. The state government  is tormenting its own people." Though INC party spokesman Subodh Srivastava said that "several party leaders and workers were injured in the lathicharge by police at a number of places in the state (sic) during peaceful protest and demonstration. (sic) More than 10,000 workers and leaders were arrested across the state," the UP government said that there was no impact as a result of the INC agitation and that only 135 people had been arrested in apprehension of breach of peace during the ensuing chakka jam in protest against Gandhi's arrest. Mayawati responded also to the Gandhi agitation by saying: "I would like to tell Yuvraj that whatever struggle he has to do, he should do in his home first, as the decision is in the hands of the Centre...It seems that he is not being heard in his own home and he is venting his frustration by indulging in mean dramatics."

The same day his mother, Sonia Gandhi, visited her national constituency of Rae Bareli to review the implementation of such nationally sponsored rural employment and housing schemes as the Mahatma Gandhi National Rural Employment Guarantee Act where she called for better implementation of the various schemes such as to ensure that 100 days of employment would be provided to a maximum number of families.

Under the pretext of land acquisition, the action was read as having gathered pace as after other legislative elections. The Times of India read the move as "a bigger favour from jittery chief minister Mayawati" and that the "subsequent free-for-all" included INC staging anti-Mayawati protests as well as BJP leaders trying not to be undone by "also courting trouble" on the basis of "land-related strife everywhere...giving politicians scope for photo ops." It also said that Mayawati may have had a "point in lobbing the land acquisition ball back into the Centre's (national government) court" but that attempts to "keeping law and order will only make her opponents look good for being martyred;" while it still question if the INC were "genuinely friends of farmers, tribals, Dalits, et al."

Corruption issues
A Centre for Media Studies report showed that the corruption has increased in UP. The Central Bureau of Investigation said there was "strong evidence" against incumbent Chief Minister Mayawati in a case about
disproportionate assets for a public figure; while Samajwadi party leader Mulayam Singh Yadav also has a case pending against him in a similar case. Out of a total of 403 MLAs, 143 face criminal charges.

The Chief Election Commissioner has raised concerns about the use of money in the election for some form of undue campaigning. After the EC imposed restrictions on the movement of unaccounted money, police checks across UP netted over 120 million in cash, several kilogrammes of silver and weapons, leading to the arrest of at least one person.

The Uttar Pradesh government was also sent a notice by the national government for alleged corruption in MGNREGA. Mayawati, however rejected the allegations as "politically motivated." She has also been accused by former minister Avdesh Verma of selling party tickets in the election for Rs. 40 million. Furthermore, the BSP also expelled Badshah Singh and Babu Singh Kushwaha, who had been removed after CBI evidence of corruption, from the party on charges of corruption.

During the tenure of the incumbent CM Mayawati, opposition parties have accused her of constructing parks and statues of herself and other dalit icons such as Ambedkar and Kanshi Ram in places such as Noida and Lucknow that cost the exchequer crores of rupees in the name of development and social upliftment for dalits. The Uttar Pradesh Government was also criticised by the Supreme Court for not halting the construction of the memorials. despite an order to do so. On 7 January the Chief Election Commissioner S. Y. Quraishi ordered for the veiling of statues of all political figures except for Mohandas Gandhi, as well as veiling the BSP's symbol the elephant, in order to have a "level playing field" by 11 January at 17:00, according to the District Magistrate of Gautam Budh Nagar, though Chief Electoral Officer Umesh Sinha said the deadline was 15 January but the government should try and do so earlier in view of the implementation of code of conduct. However, in Lucknow BSP activists were reported to have removed the a veil minutes after it had been installed. The BSP called the move as "completely wrong" and "not justified." Quraishi dismissed criticism of the order as "ill-informed" and add that he was "surprised [the order] has been taken as something unusual. There is a model code of conduct which says there should be a level-playing field for all candidates and parties." On 9 January, social activist Dheeraj Singh filed a PIL in the Allahabad High Court challenging the EC's order on the grounds that the elephants represent Ganesha and veiling them could hurt public sentiment. On 11 January the High Court dismissed the petition as "withdrawn" on technical grounds.

Campaign
The INC's Rahul Gandhi started his campaign on 14 November 2011 before the announcement of the election phases, while Mulayam Singh Yadav started his campaign on 8 January with criticism of the ruling BSP for "corruption and atrocities on people." Rahul Gandhi toured one of the most impoverished area of the country on 17 January, Bundelkhand in Lalitpur. He also visited Mauranipur, Chirgaon, Jhansi and Mahoba, where he was reportedly shown black flags over the issue of black money. He promised to bring change, while also questioning the BSP government's alleged corruption in the MGNREGA scheme. Prime Minister Manmohan Singh addressed a rally in Kanpur on 17 February where he alleged that the U.P. government is not cooperating with the national government in regards to infrastructure development despite receiving five times the funds demanded. He also criticised the incumbent government's alleged corruption and U.P.'s infrastructure woes. "The reason behind this bad situation is that non- Congress governments which came to power in the state in the last 22 years did not pay attention either to governance or the problems of the common man. The Congress will win UP elections. Sonia Gandhi and Rahul Gandhi will ensure Congress' victory in UP...we will work with greater strength for the development of UP if the Congress comes to power. There is a need to change this situation. You need a government which changes the shape of UP and focuses on development by rising above caste and religious lines. Congress led by Sonia Gandhi and Rahul Gandhi can provide such a government." The INC also got the endorsement of the Jamiat Ulama-i-Hind. After the first three phases of voting the party was said to have been cautious about its expectations of winning the election.

The BJP formally began its campaign on 10 January, but would start hosting public meeting 10 days later. Party leaders from outside UP had been called in to campaign, though many refused to show support for candidates with corruption allegations. These included former PM Atal Behari Vajpayee, Gujarat CM Narendra Modi, former PM-candidate and Home Minister MP Lal Krishna Advani, MP Sushma Swaraj, former Law Minister MP Arun Jaitley. UP MP Murli Manohar Joshi, Madhya Pradesh CM Shivraj Singh Chouhan, Chhattisgarh CM Raman Singh, Jharkhand CM Arjun Munda, Bihar Deputy CM Sushil Modi, former Rajasthan CM Vasundhara Raje, Ananth Kumar, Ravi Shankar Prasad, Narendra Singh Tomar, party deputy leader in the Lok Sabha Gopinath Munde, party deputy leader in the Rajya Sabha SS Ahluwalia, party Muslim member Shahnawaz Hussain, party vice president Mukhtar Abbas Naqvi, MP Shatrughan Sinha, MP Hema Malini, MP Smriti Irani, MP Navjot Singh Sidhu, Kalraj Mishra, Vinay Katiyar, Ramlal, former Foreign Minister MP Yashwant Sinha, former Madhya Pradesh CM and re-inductee into the party Uma Bharti, UP MP Varun Gandhi, Ramapati Ram Tripathi, Kesarinath Tripathi, Ramnath Kovind, Saudan Singh and Radha Mohan Singh. On 16 January, national BJP President Nitin Gadkari released the party manifesto for the election in Lucknow. Part of its promises included creating 15 million jobs within five years, as well providing rice and wheat at a subsidised Rs. 3 and Rs. 2 per kilogramme, respectively. It also included a promise to probe alleged cases of corruption during the tenure of the BSP government. On 18 January, they opted to field Uma Bharti from the Charkari constituency in Mahoba.

Incumbent CM Mayawati began her campaign on 27 January at a rally in Bijnor. On 15 January, she released the BSP's list of candidates for all the 403 constituencies. The list included 88 candidates belonging to SCs, 113 from OBCs, 85 religious minorities and 117 upper castes, out of which 74 are Brahmins.

On 20 January, the Samajwadi Party released its electoral manifesto in Lucknow which included promising reservation for the minorities, a ban on land acquisition and loans of four percent interest to small farmers. Party chief Mulayam Singh Yadav got an endorsement from the Shahi Imam of New Delhi's Jama Masjid Syed Ahmed Bukhari, who had appealed to Muslim voters to vote for the SP and alleged that the INC had regressed UP's fortunes.

The anti-corruption group Team Anna also decided to campaign in four of the five provinces that are holding Vidhan Sabha elections, except Manipur; however they said that they would not do so in favour of or against any particular party. They started their campaign in Haridwar on 21 January.

Controversies
The Supreme Court also criticised the UP government for the Land Acquisition Act calling it "an engine of oppression" for the government's low cost acquisition without adequate redress for the villagers, who were then beaten by police. It said that the policy as "anti-poor" and against the interests of the "common man," while citing that after its inception in 1894 it had to be immediately amended. At the same time, INC general secretary Rahul Gandhi toured two villages to start an agitation march against such acquisitions

On 22 December 2011 the national government announced a four and half percent sub-quota for "backward Muslims" as part of an expanded definition of Other Backward Castes in the civil service and at educational institutions, which came into effect on 1 January. BJP leaders Sushma Swaraj and Arun Jaitley strongly objected to the proposal on the grounds that it was "unconstitutional" with the purpose of campaigning to wooing Muslim voters in the election.
On 10 January, Minority Affairs Minister Salman Khurshid was sent a notice by the ECI on a complaint filed by the BJP, led by Mukhtar Abbas Naqvi, after Khurshid had said that if the INC was victorious in the election, it would double the quota for Muslims to nine percent. He then reiterated that the comments was a "promise not [an] allurement." The following day the ECI decided to put on hold the sub-quota for minorities till the election ends as it was in violation of the Model Code of Conduct.

The ECI replaced the UP DGP Brij Lal and Home Secretary Fateh Bahadur on 8 January after complaints from other parties that they were partisan on the issue of covering the statues.

On 22 January, the ECI banned exit polls from 28 January to 3 March in accordance with the relevant provisions of the Representation of the People Act, 1951. Opinion polls were also banned 48 hours prior to the voting of each phase in the electronic media, however there was no such restriction on the print media.

Individual candidates
After being fired from the BSP for corruption, Babu Singh Kushwaha, Badshah Singh and Awdhesh Verma joined the BJP. Kushwaha has wanted to join the INC but was blocked by Rahul Gandhi, who criticised the BJP for giving them tickets. Additionally, Daddan Mishra also resigned from the BSP after being denied a ticket to run in the election and consequently joined the BJP.

Opinion polls
All opinion polls indicated a hung assembly.

Election
Almost all the exit polls pointed to a hung assembly with the SP outperforming its rivals while the BSP lost a large share of the seats it previously held. The INC and the BJP also were expected to perform better than the previous election but significantly short of the simple majority mark.

Result

The BSP's CM Mayawati's cabinet approving the dissolution of the Vidhan Sabha assembly on the night of 4 March and sent the recommendation to the Governor for consent. Mulayam Singh Yadav's son and UP president of the Samajwadi Party Akhilesh Yadav was nominated as Chief Minister by the party.

|-
! style="background-color:#E9E9E9;text-align:left;" width=225 |Party
! style="background-color:#E9E9E9;text-align:right;" |Seats contested
! style="background-color:#E9E9E9;text-align:right;" |Seats won
! style="background-color:#E9E9E9;text-align:right;" |Seat change
! style="background-color:#E9E9E9;text-align:right;" |Vote share
! style="background-color:#E9E9E9;text-align:right;" |Swing
|- style="background: #90EE90;"
| style="text-align:left;" |Samajwadi Party
| style="text-align:center;" | 401
| style="text-align:center;" | 224
| style="text-align:center;" |  127
| style="text-align:center;" | 29.15%
| style="text-align:center;" |  3.72%
|-
| style="text-align:left;" |Bahujan Samaj Party
| style="text-align:center;" | 403
| style="text-align:center;" | 80
| style="text-align:center;" |  126
| style="text-align:center;" | 25.91%
| style="text-align:center;" |  4.52%
|-
| style="text-align:left;" |Bharatiya Janata Party
| style="text-align:center;" | 398
| style="text-align:center;" | 47
| style="text-align:center;" |  4
| style="text-align:center;" | 15%
| style="text-align:center;" |  1.97%
|-
| style="text-align:left;" |Indian National Congress
| style="text-align:center;" | 355
| style="text-align:center;" | 28
| style="text-align:center;" |  6
| style="text-align:center;" | 11.63%
| style="text-align:center;" |  3.03%
|-
| style="text-align:left;" |Rashtriya Lok Dal
| style="text-align:center;" | 46
| style="text-align:center;" | 9
| style="text-align:center;" |  1
| style="text-align:center;" | 2.33%
| style="text-align:center;" |
|-
| style="text-align:left;" |Peace Party of India
| style="text-align:center;" | 208
| style="text-align:center;" | 4
| style="text-align:center;" |  4
| style="text-align:center;" | 2.82%
| style="text-align:center;" | 2.82%
|-
|style="text-align:left;"|Quami Ekta Dal
|style="text-align:center;"|43
|style="text-align:center;"|2
|style="text-align:center;"|
|style="text-align:center;"|0.55%
|style="text-align:center;"|
|-
|style="text-align:left;"|Apna Dal
|style="text-align:center;"|76
|style="text-align:center;"|1
|style="text-align:center;"|1
|style="text-align:center;"|0.90%
|style="text-align:center;"|
|-
| style="text-align:left;" |Nationalist Congress Party
| style="text-align:center;" | 127
| style="text-align:center;" | 1
| style="text-align:center;" |  0
| style="text-align:center;" | 0.33%
| style="text-align:center;" |
|-
|style="text-align:left;"|Ittehad-e-Millat Council
|style="text-align:center;"|18
|style="text-align:center;"|1
|style="text-align:center;"|
|style="text-align:center;"|0.25%
|style="text-align:center;"|
|-
|style="text-align:left;"|Independents
|style="text-align:center;"|1691
|style="text-align:center;"|6
|style="text-align:center;"|
|style="text-align:center;"|4.13%
|style="text-align:center;"|
|- style="background-color:#E9E9E9"
|style="text-align:left;"|Total||-|| style="text-align:right;" |403||-|| |||
|-
|style="text-align:left;background-color:#E9E9E9" colspan=7|Turnout: 59.5%
|-
|style="text-align:left;" colspan="7"|Source: Election Commission of India
|}

Elected members

See also
 Elections in Uttar Pradesh
 2017 Uttar Pradesh Legislative Assembly election
 2022 Uttar Pradesh Legislative Assembly election
 List Uttar Pradesh Legislative Assembly elections

Notes

References

2012
2012 State Assembly elections in India
February 2012 events in India
March 2012 events in India